Ceresa albescens, is a species of treehopper, of the genus Ceresa.

References

 

Hemiptera of North America
Insects described in 1908
Smiliinae